Harry Hill's Alien Fun Capsule is a British television comedy panel show created, written and presented by Harry Hill and produced by his company Nit Television for ITV. The series began on 2 March 2017 and follows Hill and a group of celebrity guest panelists trying to find funny things to convince an alien invasion that the earth is worth saving. A second series began on 14 April 2018. A third series of the show was commissioned by ITV and started on 8 June 2019. On 4 February 2020, it was confirmed that ITV had cancelled the programme.

Format
The show revolves on Hill trying to fill an "alien fun capsule" with funny things so that aliens will not invade. Regular segments include "Local News Round-Up", where Hill and the guests sing a short song about strange headlines from the local news, Hill performing a short skit with 'Alan the Alien' to decide what the next round will be, a 'what happens next' segment, taken from You've Been Framed, where Hill shows a clip before the start of the ads and a song at the end of the show.

Episodes

Series 1 (2017)

Series 2 (2018)

Series 3 (2019)

References

External links
 
 

2017 British television series debuts
2019 British television series endings
2010s British game shows
2010s British comedy television series
English-language television shows
ITV panel games
Harry Hill